The 1925 Texas Mines Miners football team was an American football team that represented Texas School of Mines (now known as the University of Texas at El Paso) as an independent during the 1925 college football season. The team compiled a 5–1–1 record and outscored opponents by a total of 118 to 57. The team's record was the best in school history to that point; only three prior Texas Mines team had compiled winning record, and those three teams had exceeded a .500 record by only a single game.

In June 1925, George B. Powell (commonly known as Chuck Powell), a mathematics instructor at the school, was reelected to serve a second year as the school's football coach. Powell had succeeded in 1924 in eliminating the football team's financial deficit for the first time in school history. Powell was also married in the summer of 1925 and planned to attend Knute Rockne's coaching school later in the summer.

Fullback Curley Waugh was the team captain and star player. After Waugh returned a kickoff 80 yards for a touchdown, the El Paso Times wrote: "The southwest has its own "Red" Grange." Left halfback "Doggy" Byrne also earned a reputation as "one of the best broken field runners in the southwest."

The team played four of its home games at El Paso's Dudley Field; one home game was played at the El Paso High School Stadium.

Schedule

References

Texas Mines
UTEP Miners football seasons
Texas Mines Miners football